Diana Reyes (born ) is a Puerto Rican volleyball player. She is part of the Puerto Rico women's national volleyball team. On club level she played for Caguas in 2015.

References

1993 births
Living people
People from Caguas, Puerto Rico
Puerto Rican women's volleyball players
Volleyball players at the 2016 Summer Olympics
Summer Olympics competitors for Puerto Rico